Wikiloc is a website, launched in 2006, containing GPS trails and waypoints that members have uploaded. This mashup shows the routes in frames showing Google Maps (with the possibility to show the layers of World Relief Map (maps-for-free.com), OpenStreetMap, the related OpenCycleMap, USGS Imagery Topo Base Map and USGS Topo Base Map). The service is also available in Google Earth. There are mobile apps for Android and iPhone. The product has more than 11M members, is offered in many languages and has more than 37.9M tracks of dozens of activities (hiking, cycling, sailing, horseback riding, driving, paragliding, and so on) in many countries and territories. Wikiloc began as a worldwide online reference for hiking. Additionally, photographs on Wikiloc enabled automated content analysis to characterize the landscape in the Ebro Delta Natural Park, Spain.

Wikiloc does not pay its contributors. It charges users to download trails and waypoints from the website. It also prohibits bulk downloads or re-hosting of the data.

Technology 
Wikiloc runs on Linux, with a PostgreSQL database manager with PostGIS for geography support, Apache software, Hibernate, GEOS, GDAL, PROJ.4, and with some Python for preprocess and maintenance.

Awards 
Wikiloc has won the following prizes:
 Winner of the Changemakers / National Geographic 2009 Geotourism Challenge
 Winner of the Google Maps mashup contest in 2006
  Winner of the Initiative/Company award of the Spanish Geographic Society in 2013

See also
 AllTrails
 Google Fit
 Apple Health
 MSN Health & Fitness
 Runkeeper
 Strava

References

External links 
 
 Wikiloc, how a hobby grows into a Google darling (The Next Web, 1 September 2008)
 How to create your routes Wikiloc (Camera Battery Blog, via Internet Archive)
 GPS community sites: Wikiloc, EveryTrail (Ogle Earth, November 30, 2006)
 Wikiloc - free web site to discover, post and share GPS data (GPS Information.net Forum, November 9, 2006)
 Jordi Ramot, fundador de Wikiloc: "Las comunidades de viajeros serán cada vez más influyentes en cómo viajamos" (Ideal, 14 February 2010 -in Spanish-)
 Entrevista a Jordi L. Ramot, creador de Wikiloc (Aire Libre y Tecnología, 20 July 2008 -in Spanish-)

Android (operating system) software
Collaborative mapping
Crowdsourcing
GIS software
Global Positioning System
Google Maps
Satellite navigation software
IOS software
Mobile route-planning software
Web Map Services
Web mapping
Wiki communities
Wikis